The Struggle Continues is the second album by the Swedish hip hop band Looptroop. Released in 2002, it was produced by Embee.

The album peaked at No. 19 on the Swedish music charts.

Critical reception
The Independent wrote that Looptroop's "command of English would put plenty of English MCs to shame and their carefully-enunciated rhymes are technically superb, though the real star is their producer/DJ Embee and his funky loops."

Track listing
David vs. Goliath Hustlas - 1:23
Don't Hate the Player - 3:50
The Struggle Continues - 4:26
Looptroopland - 4:24
Looking for Love - 4:07
Revolutionary Step - 4:08
Musical Stampede - 4:55
Still Looking - 1:56
Who Want It - 3:57
Fly Away - 5:55
Up to the Sky - 1:00
Bandit Queen - 4:52
Get Ready - 4:04
Fruits of Babylon - 4:44
Last Song - 5:55

References

External links 
 

2002 albums
Burning Heart Records albums